Presidential elections were held in East Timor in 2007. The first round on 9 April 2007 saw six of the eight candidates eliminated. The remaining two candidates, incumbent Prime Minister José Ramos-Horta and FRETILIN President Francisco Guterres, faced each other in a runoff election on 9 May 2007. Ramos-Horta won the second round with 69% of the vote.

Candidates
Prime Minister José Ramos-Horta announced in February 2007 that he would be a presidential candidate, receiving the support of incumbent president Xanana Gusmão, who chose not to run for another term. Ramos-Horta's main opponent among the seven other candidates was parliamentary speaker Francisco Guterres, though also running were Francisco Xavier do Amaral (also a candidate in the 2002 election), Avelino Coelho da Silva of the Socialist Party, Fernando de Araújo of the Democratic Party, Lúcia Lobato of the Social Democratic Party (the sole female candidate), João Viegas Carrascalão of the Timorese Democratic Union, and Manuel Tilman of the Association of Timorese Heroes.

Campaign

Campaigning began on 23 March, the day after two people were killed in gun battles with police in the capital Dili, though Ramos-Horta did not mention this in his opening campaign speech, instead focusing on poverty.

Following the announcement of the first round results, on 26 April Araújo announced his party's support for Ramos-Horta in the second round; Ramos-Horta also received the support of four out of the five other candidates: Amaral, Lobato, Coelho da Silva, and Carrascalão. Manuel Tilman endorsed Guterres.

Between the first and second rounds, Guterres alleged that Australian soldiers in East Timor as part of Operation Astute were interfering with the election process and Fretilin campaign rallies. The Fretilin party executive José Teixeira said:

Both Ramos-Horta and the United Nations rejected the Fretilin's claims. On 8 May, the day before the second round, Ramos-Horta rebutted, saying:

Prior to polling day, both candidates agreed they would accept the result no matter the outcome, with outgoing President Xanana Gusmão also urging all sides to vote peacefully and accept the result.

Conduct
The logistics of providing the entire East Timorese population with access to voting stations proved difficult through both elections. Across the country there were 700 polling stations. Some locations were so isolated that helicopters and donkeys were needed to distribute ballot papers to them.

Amid tight security from the Australian forces present, the election was peaceful and orderly, with no violence related to the election reported. However within a day of votes being counted, irregularities began to appear. These include 87 marked voting papers found at a booth before polls opened as well as children under 17 with their own registration cards attempting to vote.

Results

Early results of the first round were announced by a spokesman for the national elections commission, Martinho Gusmão, who said that results from the capital Dili showed Ramos-Horta with about 30%, Araújo with about 25%, and Amaral and Guterres with about 20% each. On 11 April, the president of the commission said that Guterres was in first place with 28.8% and would participate in a second round to be held in May, while Ramos-Horta had 22.5% and Araújo had 18.6%. Five of the candidates — Araújo, Amaral, Lobato, Coelho, and Tilman — demanded that vote counting cease, alleging major problems in the election, and said that counting should only be conducted with all the candidates present to observe; they said that they would legally challenge the outcome. Soon afterward, Ramos-Horta joined the calls for a recount, and also called for a UN investigation regarding the absence of votes from 150,000 citizens. Commission spokesman Martinho Gusmão subsequently said on 12 April that there would not be a recount, but on 13 April he said that there were inconsistencies in the vote count and that it was possible that a re-vote might be necessary in some parts of the country. According to final results released by the electoral commission on 18 April, Guterres had 27.89% of the vote (112,666 votes) and Ramos-Horta had 21.81% (88,102 votes), which meant that the two would face each other in a second round. Araújo followed in third place with 19.18% (77,459 votes). Voter turn-out was placed at 81.79%. Following the release of the results, candidates had 24 hours to appeal, and three of the losing candidates, Araújo, Amaral, and Lobato did so, but the results were confirmed by an appeals court.

Following the second round, initial reports predicted a large majority for Ramos-Horta. Ramos-Horta said that he thought that he "could have 70-80%" of the vote, and a spokesman for the election commission said that he was in the lead in most districts. With 90% of votes counted, Ramos-Horta had 73%. However, he declined to declare victory until the results were verified and final. Subsequently, on 11 May, provisional results showed Ramos-Horta with 69% of the vote against 31% for Guterres, and Guterres accepted defeat and congratulated Ramos-Horta. Voter turnout in the second round was placed at 81%. Ramos-Horta took office on 20 May.

First round results by district

Second round results by district

References

Notes

Further reading

External links

  East Timor National Election Commission website
 East Timor Legal Information Site

Presidential elections in East Timor
East Timor
Presidential election